The International Alliance of Libertarian Parties (IALP) is an alliance of libertarian political parties around the world. Its mission is to promote libertarian politics internationally.

At the 2014 Libertarian National Convention in the United States, former chairman of the Libertarian National Committee Geoff Neale was appointed to help with the creation of an alliance of global libertarian parties. On 6 March 2015, the IALP was formed with ten founding members. As of 2021, the IALP has 21 members

Members 
Countries shaded in denote founding members of the IALP.

See also 
 List of libertarian political parties
 Libertarianism in the United States

References 

Libertarian parties
Political internationals